Route 101 is a numbered state highway running  in Rhode Island. It begins at the Connecticut state line in the town of Foster and ends at U.S. Route 6 (US 6) in the town of Scituate.

Route description

Route 101 begins at the Connecticut state line between the towns of Killingly and Foster as a continuation of Connecticut Route 101. The route, known locally as Hartford Pike, runs for about  through several reservoirs before ending at US 6 Bypass in the town of Scituate, near the north edge of the Scituate Reservoir. Route 101 passes near Jerimoth Hill, the highest point in Rhode Island.

History
In the 19th century, modern Route 101 was a toll road that was administered by the Rhode Island and Connecticut Turnpike corporation. The former turnpike route was not assigned a route number in 1923 when the state first designated route numbers. At the time, the Route 101 designation was assigned to what is now US 44. In 1934, US 44 was designated by AASHO along its current alignment. Connecticut and Rhode Island reassigned the Route 101 designation by the following year to the Rhode Island and Connecticut Turnpike route and its continuation in Connecticut.

Until 2003, eastbound signage clearly showed Route 101 beginning concurrent with the US 6 Bypass, from the eastern split of US 6 Business (Danielson Pike) and US 6 Bypass in Scituate.  Signage westbound at that intersection has now been changed to say "TO Route 101", leading to the belief that the western terminus is now the split between Hartford Pike and the US 6 Bypass, where the concurrency ended.

Major intersections

References

External links

2019 Highway Map, Rhode Island

101
Transportation in Providence County, Rhode Island
U.S. Route 44